Waneko is a Polish manga publisher, located in Warsaw, Poland. The founders of Waneko are Aleksandra Watanuki, Martyna Taniguchi and Kenichiro Watanuki.

Titles published

Manga
Adolf ni Tsugu
Ao no Exorcist
Are you Alice?
Bakuman
Citrus
Battle Royale
Beast Master
Black Lagoon
Cat Shit One
Cześć, Michael!
Deadman Wonderland
Dengeki Daisy
DOGS
Durarara!!
Durarara!! Saika
Gdy zapłaczą cykady
Great Teacher Onizuka
Highschool of the Dead
Hiroszima 1945: Bosonogi Gen
Hatsukoi Limited
Horimiya
Istota Zła
Kagen no Tsuki
Karneval
Księga Vanitasa
Kuroko's Basket
Kuroshitsuji
Kwiat i Gwiazda
Locke Superczłowiek
Love Hina
Love Stage!
Mars
Miłość krok po kroku
Na dzień przed ślubem
Nie, Dziękuję!
No Game No Life
Orange
Pamiętnik Przyszłości - Mirai Nikki
Pandora Hearts
Puella Magi Madoka Magica
Puella Magi Madoka Magica: The Movie - Rebellion
Puella Magi Madoka Magica: The Different Story
Paradise Kiss
Rewolucjonistka Utena
Rock na Szóstkę
Saiyuki	
Seimaden
[[Sekai-ichi Hatsukoi|Sekaiichi Hatsukoi]]
Silver Spoon
Special A
Ścieżki Młodości - Ao Haru Ride
Śmiech w Chmurach
Tasogare Otome x Amnesia
Time Killers
Tokyo Ghoul
Tu detektyw Jeż
Vampire Knight
Video Girl Ai
Wampirzyca Karin
Welcome to the NHK
Yami no Matsuei
Zapiski detektywa Kindaichi

Other

 (lit. Japanese Fable)
 (Polish version of How to Draw Manga)
 (lit. Kana for Merriment)
 - periodical
 (lit. Bird, Bell and I: assembly work of Misuzu Kaneko)
 (lit. Word out of paper and steel: Japan's crumb)
The New Generation of Manga Artist - artbook

External links
 official  Waneko publisher's website—

Anime and manga magazines
Comic book publishing companies of Poland
Mass media in Warsaw
Companies based in Warsaw
Publishing companies established in 1999
1999 establishments in Poland